Espenel is a commune in the Drôme department in the Auvergne-Rhône-Alpes region in southeastern France.

Population

See also
Communes of the Drôme department

References

Communes of Drôme